Neocancilla papilio is a species of sea snail, a marine gastropod mollusk in the family Mitridae, the miters or miter snails.

Subspecies
 Neocancilla papilio emersoni (Pilsbry, 1921)
 Neocancilla papilio langfordiana (J. Cate, 1962)
 Neocancilla papilio papilio (Link, 1807)

Description

Distribution
This marine species occurs off Papua New Guinea.

References

 Abbott, R. T. & Dance, S. P. (1986). Compendium of sea shells. American Malacologists, Inc: Melbourne, Florida.
 Liu, J.Y. [Ruiyu] (ed.). (2008). Checklist of marine biota of China seas. China Science Press. 1267 pp. 
 Tsuchiya K. (2017). Family Mitridae. Pp. 973-982, in: T. Okutani (ed.), Marine Mollusks in Japan, ed. 2. 2 vols. Tokai University Press. 1375 pp
 Steyn, D.G & Lussi, M. (2005). Offshore Shells of Southern Africa: A pictorial guide to more than 750 Gastropods. Published by the authors. Pp. i–vi, 1–289.
 Poppe G.T. & Tagaro S.P. (2008). Mitridae. Pp. 330-417, in: G.T. Poppe (ed.), Philippine marine mollusks, volume 2. Hackenheim: ConchBooks. 848 pp.

External links
 Link, D.H.F. (1807-1808). Beschreibung der Naturalien-Sammlung der Universität zu Rostock. Adlers Erben
 Gmelin J.F. (1791). Vermes. In: Gmelin J.F. (Ed.) Caroli a Linnaei Systema Naturae per Regna Tria Naturae, Ed. 13. Tome 1(6). G.E. Beer, Lipsiae
  Fedosov A., Puillandre N., Herrmann M., Kantor Yu., Oliverio M., Dgebuadze P., Modica M.V. & Bouchet P. (2018). The collapse of Mitra: molecular systematics and morphology of the Mitridae (Gastropoda: Neogastropoda). Zoological Journal of the Linnean Society. 183(2): 253-337

Mitridae
Gastropods described in 1807